Balasore or Baleswara is a city in the state of Odisha, about  north of the state capital Bhubaneswar and  from Kolkata, in eastern India. It is the largest town of northern Odisha and the administrative headquarters of Balasore district. It is best known for Chandipur beach. It is also called 'missile city'. The Indian Ballistic Missile Defence Programme's Integrated Test Range is located 18 km south of Balasore.

History

Excavation at villages nearby by Balasore has given evidence for three distinct cultural phases of human settlements, viz.,  Chalcolithic (2000-1000 BCE),  Iron Age (1000-400 BCE) and early historic period (400-200 BCE).

Baleswara district was part of the ancient Kalinga kingdom which later became a territory of Utkal, till the death of Mukunda Deva. It was annexed by the Mughal Empire in 1568 and remained as a part of their suzerainty up until the 1700s.

The British East India Company (EIC) established a factory at Balasore in 1633. In 1719, the Trieste Company merchants established a trading post there. As Calcutta rose in importance, Balasore became the center for river pilot services for vessels seeking to ascend the Hooghli River. The city was bombarded by forces of the East India Company during the Anglo-Mughal War in 1686 however the Company was repulsed by the Mughal forces.

The old Pipili port was located near Baliapal north of Balasore along the coast near Subarnarekha. The Portuguese arrived for trade and commerce, exporting Orissa products like rice, cotton and butter from Malaysia to Borneo, and bringing Chinese products and spices from Indonesia.

The Marathas then occupied this part of Odisha and it became a part of the dominion of the Bhonsle Maratha Rajas of Nagpur. They ceded this part through the Treaty of Deogaon in 1803 and it became a part of British Bengal Presidency until 1912.

Balasore as a separate district was created in October 1828 under the Bengal Presidency. On 7 November 1845, all of Danish India was sold to the British to form a  part of British India.

With the creation of Bihar Province, Odisha, along with Balasore district, was transferred from Bengal to Bihar. But with the creation of Odisha as a separate state on 1 April 1936, Balasore became an integral part of Odisha State. The national movement of independence surged ahead with the visit of Mahatma Gandhi in 1921. Similarly Praja Andolan was initiated against the ruler of Nilagiri State. The state of Nilagiri merged with state of Odisha in January 1948 and became a part of Balasore district. On 3 April 1993, Bhadrak sub-division became a separate district and from this day Balasore remains a district of Odisha with two Sub-divisions namely Balasore and Nilagiri having eight Tehsils, namely Balasore, Soro, Simulia, Nilagiri, Jaleswara, Basta, Baliapal and Remuna and 12 blocks namely Bhograi, Jaleswar, Baliapal, Basta, Balasore, Remuna, Nilagiri, Oupada, Khaira, Soro and Bahanaga. The name of the district is being derived from the name of the town.

Balasore is where the famous freedom fighter Jatindranath Mukherjee, also known as Bagha Jatin, was injured and died fighting the British.

Geography

Climate
Balasore's climate is generally hot with high humidity. May is the hottest month and December is the coolest one. Monsoon generally arrives in the city from June every year. The city enjoys pleasant evenings with cool breeze most of the times. Sand dunes are common in the city for which the city is popularly known as "Sand City". The average rainfall of the District is 1568.4 mm.

Demographics
According to 2011 Indian Census, Balasore (municipality + overgrowth) had a total population of 144,373, of which 73,721 were males and 70,652 were females. Population within the age group of 0 to 6 years was 14,773. The total number of literates in Balasore was 113,418, which constituted 78.6% of the population with male literacy of 81.7% and female literacy of 75.3%. The effective literacy rate of 7+ population of Balasore was 87.5%, of which male literacy rate was 91.0% and female literacy rate was 83.8%. The Scheduled Castes and Scheduled Tribes population was 15,812 and 9,291 respectively. Balasore had 30460 households in 2011.

Languages
The official language of Balasore is Odia which is also the most commonly spoken language of the city. It is followed by Bengali, Santali and Hindi in the descending order per the number of speakers.

Government and politics
The MP from Balasore Parliamentary Constituency is Pratap Chandra Sarangi of BJP, who won the seat in the Indian general elections of 2019. The MLA from Balasore Vidhan Sabha Constituency is Swarup Kumar Das of BJD, who won the seat in the 2020 bye-elections. Previous MLAs from this seat were Madan Mohan Dutta (BJP), who won the seat in 2019, Jiban Pradip Das (BJD), who won this seat in 2009, Arun Dey (CPM) in 2004, Gopa Narayan Das of INC in 1985 and Kartik Chandra Rout of JNP in 1977. Balasore is part of Balasore (Lok Sabha constituency).

Civic Utility / Amenities / Services

Healthcare
Industrial and infrastructural development has boosted the healthcare market in Balasore and attracted healthcare corporate houses to set up base in the city. Balasore government hospital was the city's first hospital. Also, it has a newly established Government Medical College at Remuna named after Fakir Mohan Senapati (FM Medical College).

Economy
Balasore is the main city in the District of Balasore. The district has four major revenue sources – industries, agriculture, fishing and tourism with its base in Chandipur. Many small and large scale industries are located both within the city limits as well as the outskirts. Balasore Alloys Limited, Emami Paper Mills, Oriplast, and Birla Tyres are some of the major industries based in Balasore. It is one of the richest cities of Odisha. The main markets of Balasore are Nua Bazara, Motiganj, FM Square, Vivekananda Marga, Station Square, ITI Chhaka, Kachehri Road, Town Hall and Nua Shahi.

Industry
In an effort to bring industry, trade and commerce to a common meaningful platform, the Confederation of Indian Industry, with local chambers like North Orissa Chamber of Commerce and Industry, serve as an interface to fight for the rights and issues concerning the industrial scenario so as to contribute to the development of the state as a whole. Members from both public and private sectors work closely with the government for the expansion of business opportunities, enhancing efficiency and competitiveness and to work on policy issues. Located in Januganj, Balasore, NOCCI is essentially a business park with a massive exhibition hall, a separate residential block with hotel and restaurant facilities and an extended building called the industry facilitation center specifically for industrial training. NOCCI comprises about 100 member units and six affiliated associations of the industrial units. NOCCI is instrumental in the promoting the initiative of the Department of Industrial Promotion and Policy, Ministry of Commerce and Industry, Government of India (GoI) through a scheme of Industrial Infrastructure Upgradation.

The Indian Ballistic Missile Defense Program's Integrated Test Range is located 18 km south of Balasore. The Defence Research and Development Organisation developed many different missiles such as Nag, BrahMos, Agni Missile among others here.

Culture/Cityscape
Balasore culture is a blend of traditional festivals, food, and music. The city offers a cosmopolitan and diverse lifestyle with a variety of food, entertainment, available in a form and abundance comparable to that in other cities.
Balasore residents celebrate both Western and Indian festivals. Diwali, Holi, Eid, Christmas, Navaratri, Good Friday, Dussehra, Muharram, Ganesha Chaturthi, Durga Puja, Raja) and Maha Shivaratri are some of the popular festivals in the city. The akhada Arts Festival during durga puja is a unique culture of Balasore. Wedding ceremony of Lac Coated Dolls (also known as Jaukandhei) which has a rich ethical and ritual values in maintaining peaceful conjugal relationship in the family while bringing the health, wealth and prosperity to an individual’s home is an important part of Balasore's folk culture.

Festivals
 Durga puja, the festival of goddess Durga, is very popular in Balasore. Idols are worshipped in many streets and localities. In this city, Durga puja is famous for its idols,  with localities trying to outsmart each other by constructing more attractive idols. Indeed, the whole city comes to a standstill on Astami, Navami and on Dashami burning of effigy of the demon Ravana (the eighth, ninth and tenth days of Durga puja) as people travel all over the city appreciating all the idols put forth by the neighbourhoods.
 Kali Puja, Just after Durga puja gets over, Balasore gear up with all their vigour to celebrate Kali puja. On the auspicious day of Diwali amidst the bursting of firecrackers.
 Kartikeshwara/Kumara puja: Kartikeshwara/Kumara is the eldest son of Lord Shiva.
 Kite flying is also celebrated with much enthusiasm and energy in the city. Kite-flying culminates with the Makara Sankranti, with kite-flying competitions being held all over the city.
 All the other regular Indian festivals like Ganesha Chaturthi, Vasanta Panchami, Holi, Eid ul-Fitr, Good Friday, Ratha Yatra, Diwali, Christmas and the numerous Hindu festivals are also celebrated.

Places of interest

Chandipur-on-sea is a seaside resort famous for its mile long beach. It is a unique beach – the tide comes to the shore only four times a day, at fixed intervals. At a distance of 30 km south-west is Panchalingeshwar, a temple and scenic spot high on a mountain. The presiding deity there, Shiva, cannot be seen. One has to touch and feel the statue as it is behind (submerged under) a waterfall. About 33 km south-west of Balasore, the town Santaragadia has the Bisweswara temple situated on a hill. The town is surrounded by hills on all sides. Nearby is Khulia village, a settlement of aboriginals. Around 30 km south-east of Balasore is a port named Dhamara.
 Kshirachora Gopinatha Temple, situated at Remuna, approximately 7 km from the main town of Balasore, was built by King Langula Narasimha Deva, who also built the famous temple at Konarka. Khirochora Gopinatha Temple is notable for its mythological story about how it was built there. The prashad of Krishna – the khira – is  famous. 
The Biranchinarayana Temple, Palia, AstaDurga, and Bhudhara Chandi are some other temples located in the region.
Jagannatha Temple, Remuna is a newly built temple in the area, the architecture of which is influenced by the famous Jagannatha Temple of Puri. It is the recent favourite tourist spot concerning the region.
 
There is a Jagannatha Temple in Nilagiri which is one of the prominent Jagannatha temples of Odisha. Lord Jagannatha, Balabhadra and Subhadra are worshipped here. Every year, Ratha Yatra is performed with all the deities.
Panchalingeswar Temple is a temple near a picnic spot in Baleswara which is located 30 km from Balasore. There is a state tourism Pantha Nivas in Panchalingeswara for tourists. Panchalingeswara is surrounded by hills and forests.

Bhujakhia Pir, situated at sunhat at the heart of the city is the tomb of Sufi saint Aasthana Sharif Hazrat Pir named as Bhujakhia Pir. The most interesting thing that both Muslim and Hindu jointly worship pir baba.
Baba Bhusandeswar Temple, is one of the largest Shiva Lingams in the World is in Bhogarai village of Balasore district, Odisha.which is located 100 km from Balasore. The 12 feet long and 14 feet width lingam is carved out on a black granite and only half of the lingam is visible. The other half has remained buried for years. The diameter of the lingam is 12 feet and has three parts. The middle portion of the lingam is octagonal in shape, about 12 feet in diameter and nearly four feet in height. The Lingam slightly leans towards the right side.
Mitrapur Jagannath Mandir is known as second Puri temple in Odisha.
Dublagadi Sea Beach is a recently explored gem near the city where one can observe a magnificent dawn turning the white sands of the beach red. In winter time, especially after or before two days of the new moon you can watch the fluorescent sea waves under the bright open sky. Recently many camps have been opened in this area by the local villagers to enjoy a beautiful stay in the lap of mother nature. The villagers maintain the area's cleanliness and the well-being of the environment.

Transport

Air
The nearest airport is Biju Patnaik Airport in Bhubaneswar which is 200 km from Balasore. Netaji Subhas Chandra Bose International Airport in Kolkata is 254 km from Balasore.

Rail
Balasore railway station is an important station on the Howrah-Chennai main line of the South Eastern Railway. The distance to Kolkata is approximately 254 km, while the distance to Bhubaneswar is about 206 km.  A branch line to Baripada starts from Rupsa, near Balasore. Balasore is connected to different parts of India through trains. There are frequent trains to Bhubaneswar, Cuttack, Rourkela, Brahmapur, Mumbai, Kolkata, New Delhi, Chennai, Guwahati, Bangalore, Puri, Pondicherry, Ernakulam.

Road

Balasore has a well developed roadways. National Highway 16 and National Highway 18 pass through the city. A part of the Golden Quadrilateral project, this highway runs from Chennai to Kolkata. Intra-city transport comprises cycle rickshaws and auto rickshaws. City bus services commenced in Balasore on 15 August 2017. The bus terminus is at Sahadev Khunta and thousands of private buses ply to hundreds of destinations every day. Many luxurious A.C buses ply to Bhubneswar, Kolkata and other nearby cities daily.

Education

Balasore is the main education hub of Northern Odisha with many engineering schools and colleges and the famous Fakir Mohan University, named after the renowned novelist Fakir Mohan Senapati, who hails from this town of Odisha. Fakir Mohan Medical College and Hospital was established in the year 2018 to boost the medical facility in Balasore and Northern Odisha.

Technical colleges/institutions
 Academy of Business Administration
 Balasore College of Engineering and Technology
 Srinix College of Engineering
 Satyasai Engineering College
 Vijayanjali Institute of Technology

Universities/colleges
 Balasore Law College
 Fakir Mohan Medical College and Hospital
 Fakir Mohan University
 Fakir Mohan Autonomous college
 Balangi Mahavidyalaya
 Sagar College of Science

Schools
 Balasore Zilla School, Balasore
 Kendriya Vidyalaya No.1, Balasore
 Town High school, Balasore
 D.A.V. Public School, Balasore
 Maharishi Vidya Mandir
 Modern Public School, Kuruda
 St. Vincent's Convent School

Sports and entertainment
Cricket is the most popular sport in the city. The city is also represented by the Balasore Baghas in the Odisha Premier League. Apart from cricket, people here love the game of football, volleyball & other sports.

Permit Field  
It is a mini stadium located in front of District Hospital in the heart of the town known to host District and State level Cricket and Football matches. Many people come here for an early morning walk or doing yoga. This place has given birth to many sports personalities of Balasore. This place is maintained by Balasore Athletic Association.

Reserved Police Line Ground 
It is a big ground belongs to the Balasore Police Department and maintained by them it used as a parade ground during various occasions. Many athletes come here for training purpose. General Public is allowed for morning walk.

Entertainment 
Balasore has several cinemas playing films in Odia, Hindi, and English languages.

Notable people
 

Gopanarayan Das (1948–2022), MLA
Reela Hota, odissi dance performer, educator and producer

See also

 Rocket launch sites
 Indian Space Research Organisation
 Thumba Equatorial Rocket Launching Station
 Chandipur

References

External links

 Online Information Center of Balasore
 Baleswar District website

 
Cities and towns in Balasore district
Port cities in India
Danish India
Former Danish colonies
Hindu–German Conspiracy